Neon (10Ne) possesses three stable isotopes: , , and . All others are under a minute, most under a second. See isotopes of carbon for notes about the measurement. Light radioactive neon isotopes usually decay to fluorine or oxygen, while heavier ones decay to sodium.

List of isotopes 

|-
| 
| style="text-align:right" | 10
| style="text-align:right" | 5
| 
| []
| 2p
| 
| (3/2−)
|
|
|-
| 
| style="text-align:right" | 10
| style="text-align:right" | 6
| 
| > [< ]
| 2p
| 
| 0+
|
|
|-
| rowspan=4|
| rowspan=4 style="text-align:right" | 10
| rowspan=4 style="text-align:right" | 7
| rowspan=4|
| rowspan=4|
| β+p
| 
| rowspan=4|1/2−
| rowspan=4|
| rowspan=4|
|-
| β+α
| 
|-
| β+
| 
|-
| β+pα
| 
|-
| 
| style="text-align:right" | 10
| style="text-align:right" | 8
| 
| 
| β+
| 
| 0+
| 
| 
|-
| 
| style="text-align:right" | 10
| style="text-align:right" | 9
| 
| 
| β+
| 
| 1/2+
|
|
|-
| 
| style="text-align:right" | 10
| style="text-align:right" | 10
| 
| colspan=3 align=center|Stable
| 0+
| 0.9048(3)
| [, ]
|-
| 
| style="text-align:right" | 10
| style="text-align:right" | 11
| 
| colspan=3 align=center|Stable
| 3/2+
| 
| [, ]
|-
| 
| style="text-align:right" | 10
| style="text-align:right" | 12
| 
| colspan=3 align=center|Stable
| 0+
| 
| [, ]
|-
| 
| style="text-align:right" | 10
| style="text-align:right" | 13
| 
| 
| β−
| 
| 5/2+
|
|
|-
| 
| style="text-align:right" | 10
| style="text-align:right" | 14
| 
| 
| β−
| 
| 0+
| 
|
|-
| 
| style="text-align:right" | 10
| style="text-align:right" | 15
| 
| 
| β−
| 
| 1/2+
|
|
|-
| rowspan=2|
| rowspan=2 style="text-align:right" | 10
| rowspan=2 style="text-align:right" | 16
| rowspan=2|
| rowspan=2|
| β−
| 
| rowspan=2|0+
| rowspan=2|
| rowspan=2|
|-
| β−n
| 
|-
| rowspan=3|
| rowspan=3 style="text-align:right" | 10
| rowspan=3 style="text-align:right" | 17
| rowspan=3|
| rowspan=3|
| β−
| 
| rowspan=3|(3/2+)
| rowspan=3|
| rowspan=3|
|-
| β−n
| 
|-
| β−2n ?
|  ?
|-
| rowspan=3|
| rowspan=3 style="text-align:right" | 10
| rowspan=3 style="text-align:right" | 18
| rowspan=3|
| rowspan=3|
| β−
| 
| rowspan=3|0+
| rowspan=3|
| rowspan=3|
|-
| β−n
| 
|-
| β−2n
| 
|-
| rowspan=3|
| rowspan=3 style="text-align:right" | 10
| rowspan=3 style="text-align:right" | 19
| rowspan=3|
| rowspan=3|
| β−
| 
| rowspan=3|(3/2−)
| rowspan=3|
| rowspan=3|
|-
| β−n
| 
|-
| β−2n
| 
|-
| rowspan=3|
| rowspan=3 style="text-align:right" | 10
| rowspan=3 style="text-align:right" | 20
| rowspan=3|
| rowspan=3|
| β−
| 
| rowspan=3|0+
| rowspan=3|
| rowspan=3|
|-
| β−n
| 
|-
| β−2n
| 
|-
| rowspan=3|
| rowspan=3 style="text-align:right" | 10
| rowspan=3 style="text-align:right" | 21
| rowspan=3|
| rowspan=3|
| β−
| 
| rowspan=3|(3/2−)
| rowspan=3|
| rowspan=3|
|-
| β−n ?
|  ?
|-
| β−2n ?
|  ?
|-
| rowspan=3|
| rowspan=3 style="text-align:right" | 10
| rowspan=3 style="text-align:right" | 22
| rowspan=3|#
| rowspan=3|
| β−
| 
| rowspan=3|0+
| rowspan=3|
| rowspan=3|
|-
| β−n ?
|  ?
|-
| β−2n ?
|  ?
|-
| rowspan=3|
| rowspan=3 style="text-align:right" | 10
| rowspan=3 style="text-align:right" | 24
| rowspan=3|#
| rowspan=3|# [> ]
| β− ?
| 
| rowspan=3|0+
| rowspan=3|
| rowspan=3|
|-
| β−2n ?
|  ?
|-
| β−n ?
|  ?
|-

 The isotopic composition refers to that in air.

References 

 
Neon
Neon